Abietic acid (also known as abietinic acid or sylvic acid) is an organic compound that occurs widely in trees.  It is the primary component of resin acid, is the primary irritant in pine wood and resin, isolated from rosin (via isomerization) and is the most abundant of several closely related organic acids that constitute most of rosin, the solid portion of the oleoresin of coniferous trees. Its ester or salt is called an abietate.

Preparation
Abietic acid is extracted from tree rosin.

It belongs to the abietane diterpene group of organic compounds derived from four isoprene units. It is used in lacquers, varnishes, and soaps, and for the analysis of resins and the preparation of metal resinates. It is found in Pinus insularis (Khasi Pine), Pinus kesiya Royle, Pinus strobus (Eastern White Pine), and Pinus sylvestris (Scots Pine).

Uses
Rosin has been used for centuries for caulking ships. It is also rubbed on the bows of musical instruments to make them less slippery. In modern times methods have been developed for improving the properties of the rosin acids, which are otherwise soft, tacky, and low-melting and subject to rapid deterioration by oxidation in air. Stability is greatly increased by heat treatment.

Resin acids are converted into ester gum by reaction with controlled amounts of glycerol or other polyhydric alcohols. Ester gum has drying properties and is used in paints, varnishes, and lacquers.

Rosin has been used to depackage integrated circuits from their epoxy coatings. It is also used as a core for tin solder wire in order to increase the flow of the melted tin when heat is applied.

In vitro effects
The 50% ethanol extracts from Resina pini of Pinus sp. (Pinaceae) showed inhibitory activity against testosterone 5α-reductase prepared from rat prostate. The fraction responsible for this activity was purified, and the active constituent was isolated and identified as abietic acid which exhibited potent testosterone 5α-reductase inhibitory activity in vitro.

Safety
Abietic acid is considered a "nonhazardous natural substance" in tall oil. In the U.S., it is listed in the Toxic Substances Control Act inventory.  Abietic acid is a contact allergen; however, compounds resulting from its oxidation by air elicit stronger responses. It is soluble in alcohols, acetone, and ethers.

References

External links
 Abietic acid MS Spectrum
 Wolfram Alpha Page

Carboxylic acids
Diterpenes
Phenanthrenes